Head Shampoo is one of the first mass-market products from the organic products movement beginning in the early 1970s. It is produced by the Head Organics Company of Carson, California USA.

The product is a shampoo first produced in 1971 by two Los Angeles-based hairstylists who were concerned about the harm they feared traditional shampoos might cause to hair and who created the formula in a garage.

The product was first sold through drug paraphernalia shops, or "head shops," hence the name. 

It is red in color and a colorless version, Clearly Head, was produced in response to concerns it would turn consumers' hair red.

External link and reference
Official website
Products introduced in 1971
Shampoo brands
Carson, California